Lieutenant-General William Longworth Dames (2 March 1806 – 20 February 1868) was a British Army officer who served as colonel of the 5th (Northumberland Fusiliers) Regiment of Foot.

Military career
Dames was commissioned into the 66th Regiment of Foot on 26 July 1826 and promoted to lieutenant on 24 November 1828. Promoted to lieutenant-colonel on 1 November 1842, he commanded the British forces during the siege of Azimghur in April 1858 during the Indian Rebellion. He became colonel of the 5th (Northumberland Fusiliers) Regiment of Foot in 1865.

References

 

1806 births
1868 deaths
British Army lieutenant generals